Thyrocopa indecora is a moth of the family Xyloryctidae. It was first described by Arthur Gardiner Butler in 1881. It is endemic to the Hawaiian islands of Oahu, Maui and Hawaii.

The length of the forewings is 7–15 mm. Adults are on wing year round. It is remarkably variable in forewing pattern.

The larvae feed on Acacia koa, where they are often abundant in dead bark, twigs and branches. They have also been recorded on dead Sophora species, Rubus hawaiiensis, leaves of Sapindus species and rotten wood.

External links

Thyrocopa
Endemic moths of Hawaii
Moths described in 1881